The Emperor Wears No Clothes is a non-fiction book written by Jack Herer.  Starting in 1973, the story begins when Herer takes the advice of his friend, "Captain" Ed Adair, and begins compiling tidbits of information about the Cannabis plant and its numerous uses, including as hemp and as a drug. After a dozen years of collecting and compiling historical data, Herer first published his work as The Emperor Wears No Clothes, in 1985.  The twelfth edition was published in November 2010, and the book continues to be cited in Cannabis rescheduling and re-legalization efforts.

The book, backed by H.E.M.P. (United States), Hanf Haus (Germany), Sensi Seeds/Hash, Marihuana & Hemp Museum, Amsterdam, (Netherlands), and T.H.C., the Texas Hemp Campaign (United States), offers $100,000 to anyone who can disprove the claims made within.  Quoting from the book's back cover:

The title of the book alludes to Hans Christian Andersen's classic fairy tale "The Emperor's New Clothes" (1837).  Herer uses Andersen's story as an allegory for the current prohibition of Cannabis.

See also
 List of books about cannabis
 Chemurgy
 The Emperor Wears No Clothes at Wikimedia Commons

References

1985 non-fiction books
1985 in cannabis
American non-fiction books
Cannabis law reform
Cannabis media in the United States
Non-fiction books about cannabis
American books about cannabis law reform